Juliane Leopold (born 1983) is a German journalist.

Life
From January 2013 to December 2018 she was editor-in-chief of the feminist blog Kleinerdrei with Anne Wizorek. From October 2014 to January 2016 she was editor-in-chief of the German edition of BuzzFeed. She came runner up in the newcomer category of Medium Magazine's Journalists of the Year 2014. She worked as a consultant for tagesschau.de. from June 2016 to July 2018 before taking over as editor-in-chief. Since October 2019, she has been the digital editor-in-chief of ARD-aktuell.

References

1983 births
Living people
German feminists
German bloggers
German women bloggers
German journalists
German women journalists
German women writers
Writers from Halle (Saale)